Lake Egmont  is a small rural community in the lower interior of the Musquodoboit Valley, in the Halifax Regional Municipality of Nova Scotia, Canada. Other communities in this area include Antrim and Wyses Corner, Nova Scotia.  The community was named after John Perceval, 2nd Earl of Egmont.

Geography
Lake Egmont is in the interior of the Musquodoboit Valley. The area is extremely hilly and forested. The most common tree found is the Maple and Spruce. The community is dotted with small homes and farms.

Navigator

References

Explore HRM

Communities in Halifax, Nova Scotia
General Service Areas in Nova Scotia